Lancelot Ribeiro (28 November 1933 – 25 December 2010) was a British modern artist. According to the Independent, he is considered to have been at "the vanguard of the influx of Indian artists to Britain."

Early life 
Lancelot Ribeiro was born in 1933  in Bombay to Goan Catholic parents, accountant João José Fernando Flores Ribeiro and his dressmaker wife Lilia Maria Cecilia de Souza (née Antunes).  He was the half-brother of artist F. N. Souza (Souza's widowed mother had remarried Ribeiro's bachelor father). Ribeiro moved to London in 1950, living with his brother while studying accountancy. He abandoned  his career as an accountant when he attended classes at St. Martin's School of Art between 1951 and 1953. He served in the Royal Air Force in Dumfries, then returned to Bombay. After working with Life Insurance Corporation, he began working professionally as a painter in 1958.

Career
Ribeiro's creative life spanned half a century, during which time he became known for a "huge body" of figurative and abstract work. From 1951 until 1953, he joined art classes at Saint Martin's School of Art, London. In 1958, he began painting professionally. 1960 saw him organize his first solo exhibition, Bombay Art Society Salon. It was soon sold out. Five other exhibitions followed this in Bombay (Mumbai), New Delhi and Calcutta (Kolkata). 1961 saw his first solo art exhibition at the Bombay Artist Aid Centre. It was included among the Ten Indian Painters exhibition., and was given an extensive tour of India, Europe, US and Canada. He also received a commission for a 12-foot mural for the Tata Iron and Steel Company.

He returned to London with his wife in 1962. There he received a grant from the Congress for Cultural Freedom in Paris. He held mixed shows at the Piccadilly, Rawinski, John Whibley and Crane Kalman galleries in London and also at the Yvon Lambert Gallery in Paris. He received an All India Gold Medal nomination. 1963 saw him co-found the Indian Painters’ Collective. In the 1960s and 1970s he held both solo and group shows. Ribeiro lectured on Indian art and culture at the Commonwealth Institute.

A retrospective covering his 1960s work was held in 1986 at Leicestershire Museum and Art Gallery.
In 1987 his work was displayed at Camden Arts Centre. In 1998, his work was displayed at LTG Gallery, New Delhi. He displayed one painting at British Art Fair, 2010 after a long absence. Ribeiro passed away in 2010 in London.

In 2013 there was a retrospective exhibition at Asia House, London in May–June. An exhibition was scheduled for New Delhi in November. In November 2016, as part of the 2017 UK-India Year of Culture, the exhibition Ribeiro: A Celebration of Life, Love and Passion was held in association with the British Museum and other institutions.

Style of art
Ribeiro's creative life spanned half a century, during which time he became known for a "huge body" of figurative and abstract work. Among his artistic productions were portrait heads, still lifes, landscapes, and pigment experiments dating back to the early 1960s which "lead to works of peculiar brilliance and transparency."

It is suggested that Ribeiro had a hand in completing some of his brother Souza's art works. Ellen Von Weigand wrote that "Souza's success and resulting social life meant that he frequently left works unfinished. Ribeiro would complete them, using the painter's harsh, aggressive strokes to form his church spires, iconographic heads and anti-naturalistic still-lives. His brother would then return to add his hasty signature to the finished piece."

Role of acrylics
In a longish obituary, The Times of London acknowledges Ribeiro's role as an "[a]cclaimed Indian artist who pioneered the use of acrylics in the 1960s, producing a brilliancy of colour in his expressionistic works".  The paper talks of Ribeiro's "increasing impatience" by the 1960s over the time it took for oils to dry, as also its "lack of brilliance in its colour potential." He took to the new synthetic plastic bases that commercial paints were beginning to use, and soon got help from manufacturers like ICI, Courtaulds and Geigy. The companies supplied him samples of their latest paints in quantities that he was using three decades later, according to the paper. Initially, the firms thought the PVA compounds would not be needed in commercially viable quantities. But they quickly recognised the potential demand and "so Ribeiro became the godfather of generations of artists using acrylics as an alternative to oils."

See also
List of alumni of Saint Martin's School of Art

References

Further reading
Lance Ribeiro, in The Times of London
Lancelot Ribeiro: Vanguard Indian Painter of Post War Britain
Grosvenor Gallery: Lancelot Ribeiro
The British Museum:Special event. Remembering Lancelot Ribeiro and other Indian artists in 1960s Britain
Retracing Ribeiro
In tribute to Lancelot Ribeiro

External links
Personal site
Lance Ribeiro, on Artnet.com
Review teaser of Ribeiro's work

1933 births
2010 deaths
Indian male painters
20th-century Indian painters
Indian emigrants to England
British male painters
20th-century British painters
Artists from Mumbai
Royal Air Force airmen
Goan Catholics
British people of Goan descent
20th-century British male artists
20th-century Indian male artists